The Eua rail (Gallirallus vekamatolu) is an extinct species of flightless bird in the Rallidae, or rail family.  It was described in 2005 from subfossil bones found on the island of Eua, in the Kingdom of Tonga of West Polynesia.

References

Eua rail
ʻEua
Eua rail
Eua rail
Eua rail
Eua rail
Fossil taxa described in 2005
Eua rail
Eua rail